William Dowdeswell (October 1804 – 5 February 1870) was a British Conservative Party politician from Gloucestershire

He was elected at the 1835 general election as one of the two Members of Parliament (MPs) for the borough of Tewkesbury in Gloucestershire,
having contested the seat unsuccessfully in 1832.
He was re-elected in 1837 and 1841, and held the seat until he stood down at the 1847 general election.

He lived at Pull Court, near Bushley.
His son William Edward Dowdeswell was an MP from 1865 to 1876.

References

External links 
 

1804 births
Conservative Party (UK) MPs for English constituencies
UK MPs 1835–1837
UK MPs 1837–1841
UK MPs 1841–1847
People from Malvern Hills District
1870 deaths